Machchafushi is one of the uninhabited islands of Alif Dhaal Atoll, Maldives. 

It is the setting for the Centara Grand Island Resort & Spa Maldives resort, which is one of the 11 5-star properties run by Centara Hotels and Resorts.

References

Uninhabited islands of the Maldives
Resorts in the Maldives